Benjamin Blumenfeld (24 May 1884, Vilkaviškis – 5 March 1947, Moscow) was a Russian chess master.

He was born in Vilkaviškis, in the Suwałki Governorate of the Russian Empire (present-day Lithuania). In 1905/06 he tied for second/third with Akiba Rubinstein, behind Gersz Salwe, in St. Petersburg (the fourth Russian championship). In 1907 he tied for second/third with Georg Marco, behind Mikhail Chigorin, in Moscow.

In 1920 he took eighth in Moscow (Russian Chess Olympiad, 1st URS-ch). The event was won by Alexander Alekhine. In 1925 he tied for second/third with Boris Verlinsky, behind Aleksandr Sergeyev, in the Moscow championship.

He invented the Blumenfeld Gambit (1.d4 Nf6 2.c4 c5 3.d5 e6 4.Nf3 b5).

In 1945 Blumenfeld defended PhD thesis on psychology, based on cognition in chess.

Notable games
Benjamin Markovich Blumenfeld vs Aron Nimzowitsch, Berlin 1903, Scotch Game: Schmidt Variation (C45), 1-0

References

External links 

1884 births
1947 deaths
People from Vilkaviškis
People from Suwałki Governorate
Lithuanian Jews
Lithuanian chess players
Soviet chess players
Jewish chess players
Chess theoreticians